The Grandfather is a 1954 Argentine family drama film directed by Román Viñoly Barreto and written by Emilio Villalba Welsh. It was based on the novel by Benito Pérez Galdós. Starring Enrique Muiño and Mecha Ortiz.

Cast
 Enrique Muiño as Don Rodrigo de Achával
 Mecha Ortiz as Lucrecia Vélez
 Santiago Gómez Cou as Recitante
 Elsa Daniel as Dorotea
 Erika Mandel as Leonor
 Florindo Ferrario as Zenén
 Enrique Fava as Prior
 Julián Pérez Ávila as Pio
 José Ruzzo as Venancio
 Amalia Bernabé as Gregoria
 Carlos Lagrotta as Dr. Gutiérrez
 Alberto Barcel as  Monseñor
 Pedro Pompillo as Don Carmelo
 Víctor Martucci as Amigo de Lucrecia
 Lina Bardo as Vicenta

External links
 

1954 films
Argentine black-and-white films
1950s Spanish-language films
1954 drama films
Films based on works by Benito Pérez Galdós
Films directed by Román Viñoly Barreto
Argentine drama films
Films based on Spanish novels
1950s Argentine films